Systole  may refer to:

Systole (medicine), a term describing the contraction of the heart
Systolic array, a term used in computer architecture
Systolic geometry, a term used in mathematics
In mathematics, Systoles of surfaces are systolic inequalities for curves on surfaces
 Also see Introduction to systolic geometry